Igor Cigolla (born 17 August 1963 in Cavalese) is an Italian former alpine skier who competed in the 1988 Winter Olympics.

References

External links
 

1963 births
Living people
Italian male alpine skiers
Olympic alpine skiers of Italy
Alpine skiers at the 1988 Winter Olympics
Universiade medalists in alpine skiing
People from Cavalese
Universiade gold medalists for Italy
Competitors at the 1985 Winter Universiade
Sportspeople from Trentino